Saint-Étienne-de-Chomeil (Auvergnat: Sent Estèfe de Chaumelh) is a commune in the Cantal department in south-central France. It belongs to the Parc Naturel Régional des Volcans d'Auvergne.

Geography
The river Rhue forms all of the commune's northern border.

Population

Sites of interest

 The Church

Dedicated to Saint-Étienne — French for Saint Stephen — this church takes elements from both Roman and Gothic architectures. Built during the 11th and 12th centuries, it is a Monument Historique since 1993.
One of its most characteristic features is its south-west capital, supporting a Sagittarius and two faces, one of which — the right one on the picture below — features an enormous tongue.

 The Castle

Saint-Étienne's castle was built during the 14th century, then heavily modified from the 17th century onwards.

 Rocher d'Urlande (Rock of Urlande)

Witness of the volcanic history of the department, the Rocher d'Urlande is now a renowned rock-climbing site.

See also
Communes of the Cantal department

References

Communes of Cantal
Cantal communes articles needing translation from French Wikipedia